Soda Springs (also, Berkeley Soda Springs and Summit Soda Springs) is a set of springs in Placer County, California that was in the 19th century once the location of a hotel and resort.
It lies at an elevation of 6047 feet (1843 m).

Serene Lakes, a pair of lakes spanning 77 acres (0.31 km2), is located in Soda Springs and Placer County.

A resort that operated at Soda Springs burned down in 1898.

See also 
East Snow Mountain Falls
Serene Lakes

References

Reference bibliography 

Unincorporated communities in California
Unincorporated communities in Placer County, California